Cheshmeh-ye Yanbolaq is a village in Badghis Province in north western Afghanistan.

It is located on the border with Turkmenistan.

The closest major cities include Herāt, Türkmenabat, Mashhad and Neyshabur.

References

External links
Satellite map at Maplandia.com

Populated places in Badghis Province